Marco Antonio Bassetti (1586–1630) was an Italian painter.

Life
He was born in Verona, and was a pupil of Felice Ricci. He then went to Venice where he was particularly influenced by the works of Tintoretto, Veronese and Jacopo Bassano. He is known to have been in Rome in 1616, and may have arrived there two years earlier. In Rome he came under the influence of the paintings of Caravaggio and Orazio Borgianni.

On his return to Verona he painted a St. Peter and Saints for the church of San Tomaso and a Coronation of the Virgin for Sant' Anastasia. He died from the plague in Verona in 1630. Among his pupils were Fra Semplice and Paolo Massimo.

His Dead Christ supported by the Virgin Mary and Mary Magdalene (c. 1616), painted on slate, is in the collection of the Fitzwilliam Museum, Cambridge.

References

Sources
 

1586 births
1630 deaths
16th-century Italian painters
Italian male painters
17th-century Italian painters
Italian Baroque painters
Caravaggisti
Painters from Verona
17th-century deaths from plague (disease)